Erick Morgan Threets (born November 4, 1981) is an American former professional baseball pitcher. Erick  has played in Major League Baseball (MLB) for the San Francisco Giants and Chicago White Sox. He attended Mendenhall Middle School and Granada High School in Livermore, California.

Career

Amateur
Threets attended Modesto Junior College, and in 2000 he played collegiate summer baseball with the Cotuit Kettleers of the Cape Cod Baseball League. He was selected by the San Francisco Giants in the 7th round of the 2000 MLB draft.

San Francisco Giants

He was prospect number 20 in the Baseball America Prospect Handbook  for the Giants, and his changeup was rated the best in the Giants' minor league system. He appeared in 3 games in 2007 and 7 in 2008 for the Giants.

Los Angeles Dodgers
He signed a minor league contract with the Los Angeles Dodgers after the 2008 season and was assigned to the AAA Albuquerque Isotopes.

Chicago White Sox
On January 14, 2010, Threets signed a minor league contract with the Chicago White Sox.

On August 29, 2010, Threets injured his throwing arm after throwing a pitch against the New York Yankees. He was placed on the DL, and had Tommy John surgery shortly thereafter. He missed all of 2011. With the White Sox in 2010, he allowed no earned runs in 12 1/3 innings.

Minor leagues
Threets signed a minor league contract with the Oakland Athletics on December 9, 2011. He was granted his release on July 14, 2012, after recording a 1.84 earned run average in 44 innings for the Triple-A Sacramento River Cats. He signed with the Dodgers on July 17 and was assigned to the AAA Isotopes, where he was 2–2 with a 5.19 ERA in 17.1 innings (18 games). In December 2012 he signed a minor league contract with the Colorado Rockies. He signed for Long Island Ducks of the Atlantic League of Professional Baseball for the 2013 season. He signed a minor league contract with the Arizona Diamondbacks in February 2015.

References

External links

1981 births
Living people
Sportspeople from Hayward, California
Baseball players from California
Major League Baseball pitchers
Modesto Pirates baseball players
Hagerstown Suns players
Long Island Ducks players
Norwich Navigators players
San Jose Giants players
Fresno Grizzlies players
San Francisco Giants players
Chicago White Sox players
Albuquerque Isotopes players
Charlotte Knights players
Sacramento River Cats players
Cotuit Kettleers players
People from Livermore, California